Malik Ghulam Mustafa Khar (born 2 August 1937) is a Pakistani politician and feudal lord who has previously served as the Chief Minister of Punjab and Governor of Punjab.

Early life
He was born on 2 August 1937 in Sanawan in Kot Addu, Punjab to a wealthy landlord family and he belongs to the Jat tribe. From his maternal side, he is a descendant of Khawaja Suleman Taunsvi of Taunsa Sharif.

He received his education from Aitchison College, Lahore.

Politics
Ghulam Mustafa Khar won his first National Assembly election in 1962 at the age of 24. He remained on posts of Minister of Water and Power, Chief Minister and Governor. In 1967, Khar joined Zulfikar Ali Bhutto as one of the founding members of the Pakistan Peoples Party as a close personal friend and political ally. He was appointed Governor and Martial Law Administrator of Punjab, the most electorally powerful province in the country by the newly sworn in President Bhutto following the collapse of Yahya Khan's military government. When the 1973 constitution was adopted in August and Bhutto became Prime Minister of Pakistan, Khar was given the portfolio of Chief Minister of Punjab Province.

Thanks to complaints from within the PPP, Khar was replaced by the far more left-leaning and intellectual Hanif Ramay. Khar was briefly reappointed Governor in March 1975 before being finally dismissed in July 1975. Bhutto's suspicions over Khar's ambitions as well as the deep divisions within the PPP in the Punjab led to his refusal to allow Khar to run for Ramay's seat in Lahore. Khar's attempts to run for the seat as an independent ended in failure. By 1976, former rivals within the PPP, Khar and Ramay were working together within the Pir of Pagaro's Pakistan Muslim League (F). However, his relations with Prime Minister Zulfikar Ali Bhutto briefly improved as he was appointed Special Assistant to the Prime Minister in 1977.

In April 2017, he joined Pakistan Tehreek-e-Insaf (PTI) and he is considered to be on the left-wing of the PTI.

Personal life
Khar has been married eight times. One of Khar's marriages was to Tehmina Durrani, a Pakistani women's rights activist and author. Her first book, My Feudal Lord, released by Vanguard Books of Lahore in June 1991, caused controversy in Pakistan's society by describing her abusive and traumatic marriage to Ghulam Mustafa Khar.

His daughter Aaminah Haq is a Pakistani model and actress noted as a Lux model and for her role in the television drama Mehndi.

Hina Rabbani Khar, the former Minister of Foreign Affairs, is the daughter of his brother Ghulam Noor Rabbani.

His son, Bilal Mustafa Khar was accused by his former wife Fakhra Younus of pouring acid over her face. Later, his son was acquitted of the charges. Four witnesses testified to seeing his son enter Fakhra's home on the day of the attack complained of receiving death threats. Later, they retracted their statements due to serious threats. In December 2003, judge dismissed the charges. Khar continued to protest his son's innocence, claiming the perpetrator was a pimp with whom his wife had been having an affair.

Writings

Books 
Zulfiqar Ali Bhutto ki Kahani, 1975, 156 p.
Khari Baten, 1987, 152 p.

Book chapter 
“Pakistan’s role in Muslim world” in the book Re-emerging Muslim World edited by Zahid Malik, published by Pakistan National Centre in 1974.

See also
 Hina Rabbani Khar
 Ghulam Noor Rabbani
 Tehmina Durrani
 Aaminah Haq
 Fakhra Younus

References

External links
 Ghulam Mustafa Khar
 Ghulam Mustafa Khar

Living people
1937 births
Pakistani landowners
Pakistani MNAs 1962–1965
Pakistan People's Party politicians
People from Multan
Governors of Punjab, Pakistan
Chief Ministers of Punjab, Pakistan
People from Muzaffargarh District
Ghulam Mustafa
Aitchison College alumni
Pakistani landlords
People from Muzaffargarh
Politicians from Muzaffargarh